Hubert Juin, pseudonym for Hubert Loescher, (5 June 1926 – 3 June 1987) was a Francophone Belgian poet, novelist, essayist and literary critic.

Works (selection)

Novels 
1978: Les Hameaux Verviers, Marabout, (with a preface by André Dhôtel), cycle of five novels consisting of:
1958: Les Sangliers, Éditions du Seuil ; reprint by Labor, 1991 
 La Cimenterie
 Chaperon rouge
 Le Repas chez Marguerite, reprint by Labor, 1983 
 Les Trois cousines

Poetry 
1971: Le Cinquième Poème, Les Éditeurs français réunis
1976: Les Guerriers du Chalco, Éditions Belfond, 
1987: La Destruction des remparts, Belfond
1957: Le Livre des déserts, Falaize

Essais 
1956: Les Bavards, Le Seuil (series "Pierres Vives"), 
1956: Pouchkine, 
1956: Aimé Césaire, poète noir, Présence Africaine
1957: Léon Bloy, Éditions de la Colombe
1958: Joë Bousquet, Seghers, in collaboration with Suzanne André and Gaston Massat
1960: Aragon, Éditions Gallimard
1962: Chronique sentimentale, Mercure de France
1968: Les Libertinages de la raison, Belfond
1968: Les Incertitudes du réel, Brussels, Sodi
1969: Charles Van Lerberghe, Seghers
1970: 369 Édition spéciale
1970: Charles Nodier, Seghers
1972: Écrivains de l'avant-siècle, Seghers
1974: Barbey d'Aurevilly, Seghers
1975: André Hardellet,  Seghers
1986: Victor Hugo, - Prix quinquennal de l'essai de la Communauté française de Belgique
2007: Célébration du grand-père, 
2010 Lectures du XIXe - tomes I et II, Paris,

Anthologies composed and presented by Hubert Juin 
1957: , sixteen short stories, Club des libraires de France
1964: Les Vingt Meilleurs Récits de science-fiction, 
1965: Récits fantastiques et contes nocturnes, Le Livre-club du libraire

External links 
  JUIN HUBERT LOESCHER dit (1926-1987) on E. Universalis
 Hubert Juin on Espace Nord
 Hubert Juin on Noosfere
 Short notice on Christian Bourgois

1926 births
People from Aubange
1987 deaths
Belgian poets in French
20th-century Belgian writers
Belgian writers in French
Belgian male novelists
Belgian literary critics
Winners of the Prix Broquette-Gonin (literature)
Prix Goncourt de la Biographie winners
20th-century pseudonymous writers